is a passenger railway station located in the city of Ōtsu, Shiga Prefecture, Japan, operated by the private railway company Keihan Electric Railway.

Lines

Station layout
The station consists of two opposed unnumbered side platforms connected by a level crossing.  The station is unattended.

Platforms

Adjacent stations

History
It was relocated to its present location and renamed to its present name on January 17, 1914.

Passenger statistics
In fiscal 2018, the station was used by an average of 671 passengers daily (boarding passengers only).

Surrounding area
 Renesas Semiconductor Manufacturing Shiga Factory 
Otsu City Awazu Junior High School

See also
List of railway stations in Japan

References

External links

official home page

Railway stations in Shiga Prefecture
Stations of Keihan Electric Railway
Railway stations in Japan opened in 1913
Railway stations in Ōtsu